Bhutaniella is a genus of Asian huntsman spiders that was first described by Peter Jäger in 2000.

Species
 it contains ten species, found in Asia:
Bhutaniella dunlopi Jäger, 2001 – Bhutan
Bhutaniella gruberi Jäger, 2001 – Bhutan
Bhutaniella haenggii Jäger, 2001 – Bhutan
Bhutaniella hillyardi Jäger, 2000 (type) – Nepal
Bhutaniella kronestedti Vedel & Jäger, 2005 – China
Bhutaniella latissima Zhong & Liu, 2014 – Taiwan
Bhutaniella rollardae Jäger, 2001 – Nepal
Bhutaniella scharffi Vedel & Jäger, 2005 – China
Bhutaniella sikkimensis (Gravely, 1931) – India
Bhutaniella zhui Zhu & Zhang, 2011 – China

See also
 List of Sparassidae species

References

Araneomorphae genera
Sparassidae
Spiders of Asia